Pakora is a fritter originating from the Indian subcontinent. They are sold by street vendors and served in restaurants in South Asia and UK. It consists of items, often vegetables such as potatoes and onions, coated in seasoned gram flour batter and deep fried.

The pakora is known also under other spellings including pikora, pakoda, pakodi and regional names such as bhaji, bhajiya, bora, ponako, and chop.

Etymology
The word pakoṛā is derived from Sanskrit पक्ववट pakvavaṭa, a compound of pakva ('cooked') and vaṭa ('a small lump') or its derivative vaṭaka, 'a round cake made of pulse fried in oil or ghee'.

Some divergence of transliteration may be noted in the third consonant in the word. The sound is a hard 'da' in the Telugu language and the 'ra' sound would be an incorrect pronunciation. The sound is the retroflex flap , which is written in Hindi with the Devanagari letter ड़, and in Urdu with letter ڑ.

However, in the International Alphabet of Sanskrit Transliteration, the Hindi letter ड़ is transliterated as <ṛ>, popular or non-standard transliterations of Hindi use <d> for this sound, because etymologically, it derives from ड . The occurrence of this consonant in the word pakora has given rise to two common alternative spellings in English: pakoda, which reflects its etymology, and pakora, which reflects its phonology.

History
Early variation of pakora appears in Sanskrit literature and Tamil Sangam literature but recipe is not clearly provided as they only mention them as 'a round cake made of pulse fried in oil' and 'crispy fried vegetables' which were served as part of the meals. Early known recipes come from Manasollasa (1130 CE) cookbook where it mentions "Parika" (pakoda) and method of preparing it with vegetables and gram flour. Lokopakara (1025 CE) cookbook also mentions unique pakora recipe where gram flour is pressed into fish-shaped moulds and fried in mustard oil.

Preparation
Pakoras are made by coating ingredients, usually vegetables, in a spiced batter, then deep frying them.

Common varieties of pakora use onion, masoor dal (lentil), suji (semolina), chicken, arbi root and leaves, eggplant, potato, chili pepper, spinach, paneer, cauliflower, mint, plantain or baby corn. 

The batter is most commonly made with gram flour or mixture of gram flour and rice flour but variants can use other flours, such as buckwheat flour. The spices used in the batter are up to the cook and may be chosen due to local tradition or availability; often these include fresh and dried spices such as chilli, fenugreek and coriander.

Serving
Pakoras are eaten as a snack or appetiser, often accompanied with chutney or raita. They are also offered with masala chai to guests at Indian wedding ceremonies.

Regional names

A gram flour fritter is known in Tamil Nadu and Sri Lanka as Pakoda or bajji, Gujarat as bhajia, in Maharashtra as bhaji, in Andhra Pradesh/Telangana and Karnataka as bajji or "Pakodi". Pakoda may be interpreted in these states as deep fried balls of finely chopped onions, green chilis, and spices mixed in gram flour.

Gallery

See also

List of deep fried foods
List of Indian dishes

References

South Indian cuisine
Indian snack foods
Bangladeshi snack foods
Bangladeshi fast food
Pakistani snack foods
Pakistani fast food
Nepalese cuisine
Indian fast food
Afghan cuisine
Bangladeshi cuisine
Indo-Caribbean cuisine
Fijian cuisine
Fritters